Tripodi or Trípodi is a surname of Italian origin. People with the surname include:

Elisa Tripodi, Italian politician in the 2018 Italian general election in Aosta Valley
Emanuel Trípodi (born 1981), Argentine football goalkeeper
Fabio Tripodi (born 1973), Italian wheelchair curler
Joe Tripodi (born 1967), Australian politician
Mariano Trípodi (born 1987), Argentine footballer